Bio (stylised as bio., formerly The Biography Channel) was an Australian general entertainment channel available on Australia's Foxtel, Austar and Optus Television pay television services.

In 2014, the channel rebranded with a new on-air look, logo and programming. In addition, the channel moved from channel 117 to channel 133.

On 1 November 2015, the channel closed, ceasing transmission at 4am, with selected titles moving to other Foxtel-owned channels.

Programming 
Airline
The Dog Whisperer
Fashion File
Inside Edition
Intervention
Judge Judy
The Peoples Court
Planet Rock Profiles
RPA
Sober House
This Is Your Life

See also
FYI (U.S. TV channel)
The Biography Channel (Canada)
The Biography Channel (UK and Ireland)
FYI (South East Asia TV channel)

References

Defunct television channels in Australia
Television channels and stations established in 2004
English-language television stations in Australia
Television channels and stations disestablished in 2015
A&E Networks
Foxtel

pt:Bio.